Archaeology or archeology is the study of human activity through the recovery and analysis of material culture. The archaeological record consists of artifacts, architecture, biofacts or ecofacts, sites, and cultural landscapes. Archaeology can be considered both a social science and a branch of the humanities. It is usually considered an independent academic discipline, but may also be classified as part of anthropology (in North America – the four-field approach), history or geography.

Archaeologists study human prehistory and history, from the development of the first stone tools at Lomekwi in East Africa 3.3 million years ago up until recent decades. Archaeology is distinct from palaeontology, which is the study of fossil remains. Archaeology is particularly important for learning about prehistoric societies, for which, by definition, there are no written records. Prehistory includes over 99% of the human past, from the Paleolithic until the advent of literacy in societies around the world. Archaeology has various goals, which range from understanding culture history to reconstructing past lifeways to documenting and explaining changes in human societies through time. Derived from the Greek, the term archaeology literally means "the study of ancient history".

The discipline involves surveying, excavation, and eventually analysis of data collected, to learn more about the past. In broad scope, archaeology relies on cross-disciplinary research.

Archaeology developed out of antiquarianism in Europe during the 19th century, and has since become a discipline practiced around the world. Archaeology has been used by nation-states to create particular visions of the past. Since its early development, various specific sub-disciplines of archaeology have developed, including maritime archaeology, feminist archaeology, and archaeoastronomy, and numerous different scientific techniques have been developed to aid archaeological investigation. Nonetheless, today, archaeologists face many problems, such as dealing with pseudoarchaeology, the looting of artifacts, a lack of public interest, and opposition to the excavation of human remains.

History

First instances of archaeology

In Ancient Mesopotamia, a foundation deposit of the Akkadian Empire ruler Naram-Sin (ruled ) was discovered and analysed by king Nabonidus, who is thus known as the first archaeologist. Not only did he lead the first excavations which were to find the foundation deposits of the temples of Šamaš the sun god, the warrior goddess Anunitu (both located in Sippar), and the sanctuary that Naram-Sin built to the moon god, located in Harran, but he also had them restored to their former glory. He was also the first to date an archaeological artifact in his attempt to date Naram-Sin's temple during his search for it. Even though his estimate was inaccurate by about 1,500 years, it was still a very good one considering the lack of accurate dating technology at the time.

Antiquarians

Antiquarians studied history with particular attention to ancient artifacts and manuscripts, as well as historical sites. Antiquarianism focused on the empirical evidence that existed for the understanding of the past, encapsulated in the motto of the 18th century antiquary, Sir Richard Colt Hoare: "We speak from facts not theory". Tentative steps towards the systematization of archaeology as a science took place during the Enlightenment period in Europe in the 17th and 18th centuries.

In Imperial China during the Song dynasty (960–1279), figures such as Ouyang Xiu and Zhao Mingcheng established the tradition of Chinese epigraphy by investigating, preserving, and analyzing ancient Chinese bronze inscriptions from the Shang and Zhou periods. In his book published in 1088, Shen Kuo criticized contemporary Chinese scholars for attributing ancient bronze vessels as creations of famous sages rather than artisan commoners, and for attempting to revive them for ritual use without discerning their original functionality and purpose of manufacture. Such antiquarian pursuits waned after the Song period, were revived in the 17th century during the Qing dynasty, but were always considered a branch of Chinese historiography rather than a separate discipline of archaeology.

In Renaissance Europe, philosophical interest in the remains of Greco-Roman civilization and the rediscovery of classical culture began in the late Middle Ages, with humanism.

Cyriacus of Ancona was a restlessly itinerant Italian humanist and antiquarian who came from a prominent family of merchants in Ancona, a maritime republic on the Adriatic. He was called by his contemporaries pater antiquitatis ('father of antiquity') and today "father of classical archaeology": "Cyriac of Ancona was the most enterprising and prolific recorder of Greek and Roman antiquities, particularly inscriptions, in the fifteenth century, and the general accuracy of his records entitles him to be called the founding father of modern classical archeology." He traveled throughout Greece and all around the Eastern Mediterranean, to record his findings on ancient buildings, statues and inscriptions, including archaeological remains still unknown to his time: the Parthenon, Delphi, the Egyptian pyramids, the hieroglyphics. He noted down his archaeological discoveries in his diary, Commentaria (in six volumes).

Flavio Biondo, an Italian Renaissance humanist historian, created a systematic guide to the ruins and topography of ancient Rome in the early 15th century, for which he has been called an early founder of archaeology.

Antiquarians of the 16th century, including John Leland and William Camden, conducted surveys of the English countryside, drawing, describing and interpreting the monuments that they encountered.

The OED first cites "archaeologist" from 1824; this soon took over as the usual term for one major branch of antiquarian activity. "Archaeology", from 1607 onwards, initially meant what we would call "ancient history" generally, with the narrower modern sense first seen in 1837.

12th century Indian scholar Kalhana's writings involved recording of local traditions, examining manuscripts, inscriptions, coins and architectures, which is described as one of the earliest traces of archaeology.

First excavations

One of the first sites to undergo archaeological excavation was Stonehenge and other megalithic monuments in England. John Aubrey (1626–1697) was a pioneer archaeologist who recorded numerous megalithic and other field monuments in southern England. He was also ahead of his time in the analysis of his findings. He attempted to chart the chronological stylistic evolution of handwriting, medieval architecture, costume, and shield-shapes.

Excavations were also carried out by the Spanish military engineer Roque Joaquín de Alcubierre in the ancient towns of Pompeii and Herculaneum, both of which had been covered by ash during the Eruption of Mount Vesuvius in AD 79. These excavations began in 1748 in Pompeii, while in Herculaneum they began in 1738. The discovery of entire towns, complete with utensils and even human shapes, as well the unearthing of frescos, had a big impact throughout Europe.

However, prior to the development of modern techniques, excavations tended to be haphazard; the importance of concepts such as stratification and context were overlooked.

In the mid-18th century, the German Johann Joachim Winckelmann lived in Rome and devoted himself to the study of Roman antiquities and gradually acquired an unrivalled knowledge of ancient art. Then, he visited the archaeological excavations being conducted at Pompeii and Herculaneum. He was one of the founders of scientific archaeology and first applied the categories of style on a large, systematic basis to the history of art He was one of the first to separate Greek art into periods and time classifications. Winckelmann has been called both "The prophet and founding hero of modern archaeology" and the father of the discipline of art history.

Development of archaeological method

The father of archaeological excavation was William Cunnington (1754–1810). He undertook excavations in Wiltshire from around 1798, funded by Sir Richard Colt Hoare. Cunnington made meticulous recordings of Neolithic and Bronze Age barrows, and the terms he used to categorize and describe them are still used by archaeologists today.

One of the major achievements of 19th-century archaeology was the development of stratigraphy. The idea of overlapping strata tracing back to successive periods was borrowed from the new geological and paleontological work of scholars like William Smith, James Hutton and Charles Lyell. The application of stratigraphy to archaeology first took place with the excavations of prehistorical and Bronze Age sites. In the third and fourth decades of the 19th century, archaeologists like Jacques Boucher de Perthes and Christian Jürgensen Thomsen began to put the artifacts they had found in chronological order.

A major figure in the development of archaeology into a rigorous science was the army officer and ethnologist, Augustus Pitt Rivers, who began excavations on his land in England in the 1880s. His approach was highly methodical by the standards of the time, and he is widely regarded as the first scientific archaeologist. He arranged his artifacts by type or "typologically, and within types by date or "chronologically". This style of arrangement, designed to highlight the evolutionary trends in human artifacts, was of enormous significance for the accurate dating of the objects. His most important methodological innovation was his insistence that all artifacts, not just beautiful or unique ones, be collected and catalogued.

William Flinders Petrie is another man who may legitimately be called the Father of Archaeology. His painstaking recording and study of artifacts, both in Egypt and later in Palestine, laid down many of the ideas behind modern archaeological recording; he remarked that "I believe the true line of research lies in the noting and comparison of the smallest details." Petrie developed the system of dating layers based on pottery and ceramic findings, which revolutionized the chronological basis of Egyptology. Petrie was the first to scientifically investigate the Great Pyramid in Egypt during the 1880s. He was also responsible for mentoring and training a whole generation of Egyptologists, including Howard Carter who went on to achieve fame with the discovery of the tomb of 14th-century BC pharaoh Tutankhamun.

The first stratigraphic excavation to reach wide popularity with public was that of Hissarlik, on the site of ancient Troy, carried out by Heinrich Schliemann, Frank Calvert and Wilhelm Dörpfeld in the 1870s. These scholars individuated nine different cities that had overlapped with one another, from prehistory to the Hellenistic period. Meanwhile, the work of Sir Arthur Evans at Knossos in Crete revealed the ancient existence of an equally advanced Minoan civilization.

The next major figure in the development of archaeology was Sir Mortimer Wheeler, whose highly disciplined approach to excavation and systematic coverage in the 1920s and 1930s brought the science on swiftly. Wheeler developed the grid system of excavation, which was further improved by his student Kathleen Kenyon.

Archaeology became a professional activity in the first half of the 20th century, and it became possible to study archaeology as a subject in universities and even schools. By the end of the 20th century nearly all professional archaeologists, at least in developed countries, were graduates. Further adaptation and innovation in archaeology continued in this period, when maritime archaeology and urban archaeology became more prevalent and rescue archaeology was developed as a result of increasing commercial development.

Purpose

The purpose of archaeology is to learn more about past societies and the development of the human race. Over 99% of the development of humanity has occurred within prehistoric cultures, who did not make use of writing, thereby no written records exist for study purposes. Without such written sources, the only way to understand prehistoric societies is through archaeology. Because archaeology is the study of past human activity, it stretches back to about 2.5 million years ago when the first stone tools are found – The Oldowan Industry. Many important developments in human history occurred during prehistory, such as the evolution of humanity during the Paleolithic period, when the hominins developed from the australopithecines in Africa and eventually into modern Homo sapiens. Archaeology also sheds light on many of humanity's technological advances, for instance the ability to use fire, the development of stone tools, the discovery of metallurgy, the beginnings of religion and the creation of agriculture. Without archaeology, little or nothing would be known about the use of material culture by humanity that pre-dates writing.

However, it is not only prehistoric, pre-literate cultures that can be studied using archaeology but historic, literate cultures as well, through the sub-discipline of historical archaeology. For many literate cultures, such as Ancient Greece and Mesopotamia, their surviving records are often incomplete and biased to some extent. In many societies, literacy was restricted to the elite classes, such as the clergy, or the bureaucracy of court or temple. The literacy of aristocrats has sometimes been restricted to deeds and contracts. The interests and world-view of elites are often quite different from the lives and interests of the populace. Writings that were produced by people more representative of the general population were unlikely to find their way into libraries and be preserved there for posterity. Thus, written records tend to reflect the biases, assumptions, cultural values and possibly deceptions of a limited range of individuals, usually a small fraction of the larger population. Hence, written records cannot be trusted as a sole source. The material record may be closer to a fair representation of society, though it is subject to its own biases, such as sampling bias and differential preservation.

Often, archaeology provides the only means to learn of the existence and behaviors of people of the past. Across the millennia many thousands of cultures and societies and billions of people have come and gone of which there is little or no written record or existing records are misrepresentative or incomplete. Writing as it is known today did not exist in human civilization until the 4th millennium BCE, in a relatively small number of technologically advanced civilizations. In contrast, Homo sapiens has existed for at least 200,000 years, and other species of Homo for millions of years (see Human evolution). These civilizations are, not coincidentally, the best-known; they are open to the inquiry of historians for centuries, while the study of pre-historic cultures has arisen only recently. Within a literate civilization many events and important human practices may not be officially recorded. Any knowledge of the early years of human civilization – the development of agriculture, cult practices of folk religion, the rise of the first cities – must come from archaeology.

In addition to their scientific importance, archaeological remains sometimes have political or cultural significance to descendants of the people who produced them, monetary value to collectors, or strong aesthetic appeal. Many people identify archaeology with the recovery of such aesthetic, religious, political, or economic treasures rather than with the reconstruction of past societies.

This view is often espoused in works of popular fiction, such as Raiders of the Lost Ark, The Mummy, and King Solomon's Mines. When unrealistic subjects are treated more seriously, accusations of pseudoscience are invariably levelled at their proponents (see Pseudoarchaeology). However, these endeavours, real and fictional, are not representative of modern archaeology.

Theory

There is no one approach to archaeological theory that has been adhered to by all archaeologists. When archaeology developed in the late 19th century, the first approach to archaeological theory to be practiced was that of cultural-history archaeology, which held the goal of explaining why cultures changed and adapted rather than just highlighting the fact that they did, therefore emphasizing historical particularism. In the early 20th century, many archaeologists who studied past societies with direct continuing links to existing ones (such as those of Native Americans, Siberians, Mesoamericans etc.) followed the direct historical approach, compared the continuity between the past and contemporary ethnic and cultural groups. In the 1960s, an archaeological movement largely led by American archaeologists like Lewis Binford and Kent Flannery arose that rebelled against the established cultural-history archaeology. They proposed a "New Archaeology", which would be more "scientific" and "anthropological", with hypothesis testing and the scientific method very important parts of what became known as processual archaeology.

In the 1980s, a new postmodern movement arose led by the British archaeologists Michael Shanks, Christopher Tilley, Daniel Miller, and Ian Hodder, which has become known as post-processual archaeology. It questioned processualism's appeals to scientific positivism and impartiality, and emphasized the importance of a more self-critical theoretical reflexivity. However, this approach has been criticized by processualists as lacking scientific rigor, and the validity of both processualism and post-processualism is still under debate. Meanwhile, another theory, known as historical processualism, has emerged seeking to incorporate a focus on process and post-processual archaeology's emphasis of reflexivity and history.

Archaeological theory now borrows from a wide range of influences, including neo-evolutionary thought,[35] phenomenology, postmodernism, agency theory, cognitive science, structural functionalism, gender-based and feminist archaeology, and systems theory.

Methods

An archaeological investigation usually involves several distinct phases, each of which employs its own variety of methods. Before any practical work can begin, however, a clear objective as to what the archaeologists are looking to achieve must be agreed upon. This done, a site is surveyed to find out as much as possible about it and the surrounding area. Second, an excavation may take place to uncover any archaeological features buried under the ground. And, third, the information collected during the excavation is studied and evaluated in an attempt to achieve the original research objectives of the archaeologists. It is then considered good practice for the information to be published so that it is available to other archaeologists and historians, although this is sometimes neglected.

Remote sensing
Before actually starting to dig in a location, remote sensing can be used to look where sites are located within a large area or provide more information about sites or regions. There are two types of remote sensing instruments—passive and active. Passive instruments detect natural energy that is reflected or emitted from the observed scene. Passive instruments sense only radiation emitted by the object being viewed or reflected by the object from a source other than the instrument. Active instruments emit energy and record what is reflected. Satellite imagery is an example of passive remote sensing. Here are two active remote sensing instruments:

 Lidar: Lidar (light detection and ranging) uses a laser (light amplification by stimulated emission of radiation) to transmit a light pulse and a receiver with sensitive detectors to measure the backscattered or reflected light. Distance to the object is determined by recording the time between the transmitted and backscattered pulses and using the speed of light to calculate the distance travelled. Lidars can determine atmospheric profiles of aerosols, clouds, and other constituents of the atmosphere.

 Laser altimeter: A laser altimeter uses a lidar (see above) to measure the height of the instrument platform above the surface. By independently knowing the height of the platform with respect to the mean Earth's surface, the topography of the underlying surface can be determined.

Field survey

The archaeological project then continues (or alternatively, begins) with a field survey. Regional survey is the attempt to systematically locate previously unknown sites in a region. Site survey is the attempt to systematically locate features of interest, such as houses and middens, within a site. Each of these two goals may be accomplished with largely the same methods.

Survey was not widely practiced in the early days of archaeology. Cultural historians and prior researchers were usually content with discovering the locations of monumental sites from the local populace, and excavating only the plainly visible features there. Gordon Willey pioneered the technique of regional settlement pattern survey in 1949 in the Viru Valley of coastal Peru, and survey of all levels became prominent with the rise of processual archaeology some years later.

Survey work has many benefits if performed as a preliminary exercise to, or even in place of, excavation. It requires relatively little time and expense, because it does not require processing large volumes of soil to search out artifacts. (Nevertheless, surveying a large region or site can be expensive, so archaeologists often employ sampling methods.) As with other forms of non-destructive archaeology, survey avoids ethical issues (of particular concern to descendant peoples) associated with destroying a site through excavation. It is the only way to gather some forms of information, such as settlement patterns and settlement structure. Survey data are commonly assembled into maps, which may show surface features and/or artifact distribution.

The simplest survey technique is surface survey. It involves combing an area, usually on foot but sometimes with the use of mechanized transport, to search for features or artifacts visible on the surface. Surface survey cannot detect sites or features that are completely buried under earth, or overgrown with vegetation. Surface survey may also include mini-excavation techniques such as augers, corers, and shovel test pits. If no materials are found, the area surveyed is deemed sterile.

Aerial survey is conducted using cameras attached to airplanes, balloons, UAVs, or even Kites. A bird's-eye view is useful for quick mapping of large or complex sites. Aerial photographs are used to document the status of the archaeological dig. Aerial imaging can also detect many things not visible from the surface. Plants growing above a buried man-made structure, such as a stone wall, will develop more slowly, while those above other types of features (such as middens) may develop more rapidly. Photographs of ripening grain, which changes colour rapidly at maturation, have revealed buried structures with great precision. Aerial photographs taken at different times of day will help show the outlines of structures by changes in shadows. Aerial survey also employs ultraviolet, infrared, ground-penetrating radar wavelengths, Lidar and thermography.

Geophysical survey can be the most effective way to see beneath the ground. Magnetometers detect minute deviations in the Earth's magnetic field caused by iron artifacts, kilns, some types of stone structures, and even ditches and middens. Devices that measure the electrical resistivity of the soil are also widely used. Archaeological features whose electrical resistivity contrasts with that of surrounding soils can be detected and mapped. Some archaeological features (such as those composed of stone or brick) have higher resistivity than typical soils, while others (such as organic deposits or unfired clay) tend to have lower resistivity.

Although some archaeologists consider the use of metal detectors to be tantamount to treasure hunting, others deem them an effective tool in archaeological surveying. Examples of formal archaeological use of metal detectors include musketball distribution analysis on English Civil War battlefields, metal distribution analysis prior to excavation of a 19th-century ship wreck, and service cable location during evaluation. Metal detectorists have also contributed to archaeology where they have made detailed records of their results and refrained from raising artifacts from their archaeological context. In the UK, metal detectorists have been solicited for involvement in the Portable Antiquities Scheme.

Regional survey in underwater archaeology uses geophysical or remote sensing devices such as marine magnetometer, side-scan sonar, or sub-bottom sonar.

Excavation

Archaeological excavation existed even when the field was still the domain of amateurs, and it remains the source of the majority of data recovered in most field projects. It can reveal several types of information usually not accessible to survey, such as stratigraphy, three-dimensional structure, and verifiably primary context.

Modern excavation techniques require that the precise locations of objects and features, known as their provenance or provenience, be recorded. This always involves determining their horizontal locations, and sometimes vertical position as well (also see Primary Laws of Archaeology). Likewise, their association, or relationship with nearby objects and features, needs to be recorded for later analysis. This allows the archaeologist to deduce which artifacts and features were likely used together and which may be from different phases of activity. For example, excavation of a site reveals its stratigraphy; if a site was occupied by a succession of distinct cultures, artifacts from more recent cultures will lie above those from more ancient cultures.

Excavation is the most expensive phase of archaeological research, in relative terms. Also, as a destructive process, it carries ethical concerns. As a result, very few sites are excavated in their entirety. Again the percentage of a site excavated depends greatly on the country and "method statement" issued. Sampling is even more important in excavation than in survey. Sometimes large mechanical equipment, such as backhoes (JCBs), is used in excavation, especially to remove the topsoil (overburden), though this method is increasingly used with great caution. Following this rather dramatic step, the exposed area is usually hand-cleaned with trowels or hoes to ensure that all features are apparent.

The next task is to form a site plan and then use it to help decide the method of excavation. Features dug into the natural subsoil are normally excavated in portions to produce a visible archaeological section for recording. A feature, for example a pit or a ditch, consists of two parts: the cut and the fill. The cut describes the edge of the feature, where the feature meets the natural soil. It is the feature's boundary. The fill is what the feature is filled with, and will often appear quite distinct from the natural soil. The cut and fill are given consecutive numbers for recording purposes. Scaled plans and sections of individual features are all drawn on site, black and white and colour photographs of them are taken, and recording sheets are filled in describing the context of each. All this information serves as a permanent record of the now-destroyed archaeology and is used in describing and interpreting the site.

Analysis

Once artifacts and structures have been excavated, or collected from surface surveys, it is necessary to properly study them. This process is known as post-excavation analysis, and is usually the most time-consuming part of an archaeological investigation. It is not uncommon for final excavation reports for major sites to take years to be published.

At a basic level of analysis, artifacts found are cleaned, catalogued and compared to published collections. This comparison process often involves classifying them typologically and identifying other sites with similar artifact assemblages. However, a much more comprehensive range of analytical techniques are available through archaeological science, meaning that artifacts can be dated and their compositions examined. Bones, plants, and pollen collected from a site can all be analyzed using the methods of zooarchaeology, paleoethnobotany, palynology and stable isotopes while any texts can usually be deciphered.

These techniques frequently provide information that would not otherwise be known, and therefore they contribute greatly to the understanding of a site.

Computational and virtual archaeology

Computer graphics are now used to build virtual 3D models of sites, such as the throne room of an Assyrian palace or ancient Rome. Photogrammetry is also used as an analytical tool, and digital topographical models have been combined with astronomical calculations to verify whether or not certain structures (such as pillars) were aligned with astronomical events such as the sun's position at a solstice. Agent-based modeling and simulation can be used to better understand past social dynamics and outcomes. Data mining can be applied to large bodies of archaeological 'grey literature'.

Drones
Archaeologists around the world use drones to speed up survey work and protect sites from squatters, builders and miners. In Peru, small drones helped researchers produce three-dimensional models of Peruvian sites instead of the usual flat maps – and in days and weeks instead of months and years.

Drones costing as little as £650 have proven useful. The drones continue to have altitude problems in the Andes, leading to plans to make a drone blimp, employing open source software.

Jeffrey Quilter, an archaeologist with Harvard University said, "You can go up three metres and photograph a room, 300 metres and photograph a site, or you can go up 3,000 metres and photograph the entire valley."

The data are being analysed by the Austrian Archaeological Institute in Vienna.

Academic sub-disciplines

As with most academic disciplines, there are a very large number of archaeological sub-disciplines characterized by a specific method or type of material (e.g., lithic analysis, music, archaeobotany), geographical or chronological focus (e.g. Near Eastern archaeology, Islamic archaeology, Medieval archaeology), other thematic concern (e.g. maritime archaeology, landscape archaeology, battlefield archaeology), or a specific archaeological culture or civilization (e.g. Egyptology, Indology, Sinology).

Historical archaeology

Historical archaeology is the study of cultures with some form of writing and deals with objects and issues from the past.

In medieval Europe, archaeologists have explored the illicit burial of unbaptized children in medieval texts and cemeteries. In downtown New York City, archaeologists have exhumed the 18th century remains of the African Burial Ground. When remnants of the WWII Siegfried Line were being destroyed, emergency archaeological digs took place whenever any part of the line was removed, to further scientific knowledge and reveal details of the line's construction.

Ethnoarchaeology

Ethnoarchaeology is the ethnographic study of living people, designed to aid in our interpretation of the archaeological record. The approach first gained prominence during the processual movement of the 1960s, and continues to be a vibrant component of post-processual and other current archaeological approaches. Early ethnoarchaeological research focused on hunter-gatherer or foraging societies; today ethnoarchaeological research encompasses a much wider range of human behaviour.

Experimental archaeology

Experimental archaeology represents the application of the experimental method to develop more highly controlled observations of processes that create and impact the archaeological record. In the context of the logical positivism of processualism with its goals of improving the scientific rigor of archaeological epistemologies the experimental method gained importance. Experimental techniques remain a crucial component to improving the inferential frameworks for interpreting the archaeological record.

Archaeometry

Archaeometry aims to systematize archaeological measurement. It emphasizes the application of analytical techniques from physics, chemistry, and engineering. It is a field of research that frequently focuses on the definition of the chemical composition of archaeological remains for source analysis. Archaeometry also investigates different spatial characteristics of features, employing methods such as space syntax techniques and geodesy as well as computer-based tools such as geographic information system technology. Rare earth elements patterns may also be used. A relatively nascent subfield is that of archaeological materials, designed to enhance understanding of prehistoric and non-industrial culture through scientific analysis of the structure and properties of materials associated with human activity.

Cultural resources management

Archaeology can be a subsidiary activity within Cultural resources management (CRM), also called Cultural heritage management (CHM) in the United Kingdom. CRM archaeologists frequently examine archaeological sites that are threatened by development. Today, CRM accounts for most of the archaeological research done in the United States and much of that in western Europe as well. In the US, CRM archaeology has been a growing concern since the passage of the National Historic Preservation Act (NHPA) of 1966, and most taxpayers, scholars, and politicians believe that CRM has helped preserve much of that nation's history and prehistory that would have otherwise been lost in the expansion of cities, dams, and highways. Along with other statutes, the NHPA mandates that projects on federal land or involving federal funds or permits consider the effects of the project on each archaeological site.

The application of CRM in the United Kingdom is not limited to government-funded projects. Since 1990, PPG 16 has required planners to consider archaeology as a material consideration in determining applications for new development. As a result, numerous archaeological organizations undertake mitigation work in advance of (or during) construction work in archaeologically sensitive areas, at the developer's expense.

In England, ultimate responsibility of care for the historic environment rests with the Department for Culture, Media and Sport in association with English Heritage. In Scotland, Wales and Northern Ireland, the same responsibilities lie with Historic Scotland, Cadw and the Northern Ireland Environment Agency respectively.

In France, the Institut national du patrimoine (The National Institute of Cultural Heritage) trains curators specialized in archaeology. Their mission is to enhance the objects discovered. The curator is the link between scientific knowledge, administrative regulations, heritage objects and the public.

Among the goals of CRM are the identification, preservation, and maintenance of cultural sites on public and private lands, and the removal of culturally valuable materials from areas where they would otherwise be destroyed by human activity, such as proposed construction. This study involves at least a cursory examination to determine whether or not any significant archaeological sites are present in the area affected by the proposed construction. If these do exist, time and money must be allotted for their excavation. If initial survey and/or test excavations indicate the presence of an extraordinarily valuable site, the construction may be prohibited entirely.

Cultural resources management has, however, been criticized. CRM is conducted by private companies that bid for projects by submitting proposals outlining the work to be done and an expected budget. It is not unheard of for the agency responsible for the construction to choose the proposal that asks for the least funding. CRM archaeologists face considerable time pressure, often being forced to complete their work in a fraction of the time that might be allotted for a purely scholarly endeavour. Compounding the time pressure is the vetting process of site reports that are required (in the US) to be submitted by CRM firms to the appropriate State Historic Preservation Office (SHPO). From the SHPO's perspective there is to be no difference between a report submitted by a CRM firm operating under a deadline, and a multi-year academic project. The result is that for a Cultural Resource Management archaeologist to be successful, they must be able to produce academic quality documents at a corporate world pace.

The annual ratio of open academic archaeology positions (inclusive of post-doc, temporary, and non- tenure track appointments) to the annual number of archaeology MA/MSc and PhD students is disproportionate. Cultural Resource Management, once considered an intellectual backwater for individuals with "strong backs and weak minds", has attracted these graduates, and CRM offices are thus increasingly staffed by advance degreed individuals with a track record of producing scholarly articles but who also have extensive CRM field experience.

Protection

The protection of archaeological finds for the public from catastrophes, wars and armed conflicts is increasingly being implemented internationally. This happens on the one hand through international agreements and on the other hand through organizations that monitor or enforce protection. United Nations, UNESCO and Blue Shield International deal with the protection of cultural heritage and thus also archaeological sites. This also applies to the integration of United Nations peacekeeping. Blue Shield International has undertaken various fact-finding missions in recent years to protect archaeological sites during the wars in Libya, Syria, Egypt and Lebanon. The importance of archaeological finds for identity, tourism and sustainable economic growth is repeatedly emphasized internationally.

The President of Blue Shield International, Karl von Habsburg, said during a cultural property protection mission in Lebanon in April 2019 with the United Nations Interim Force in Lebanon: "Cultural assets are part of the identity of the people who live in a certain place. If you destroy their culture, you also destroy their identity. Many people are uprooted, often have no prospects anymore and subsequently flee from their homeland."

Popular views of archaeology

Early archaeology was largely an attempt to uncover spectacular artifacts and features, or to explore vast and mysterious abandoned cities and was mostly done by upper class, scholarly men. This general tendency laid the foundation for the modern popular view of archaeology and archaeologists. Many of the public view archaeology as something only available to a narrow demographic. The job of archaeologist is depicted as a "romantic adventurist occupation". and as a hobby more than a job in the scientific community. Cinema audiences form a notion of "who archaeologists are, why they do what they do, and how relationships to the past are constituted", and is often under the impression that all archaeology takes place in a distant and foreign land, only to collect monetarily or spiritually priceless artifacts. The modern depiction of archaeology has incorrectly formed the public's perception of what archaeology is.

Much thorough and productive research has indeed been conducted in dramatic locales such as Copán and the Valley of the Kings, but the bulk of activities and finds of modern archaeology are not so sensational. Archaeological adventure stories tend to ignore the painstaking work involved in carrying out modern surveys, excavations, and data processing. Some archaeologists refer to such off-the-mark portrayals as "pseudoarchaeology".
Archaeologists are also very much reliant on public support; the question of for whom they are working is often discussed.

Current issues and controversy

Public archaeology

Motivated by a desire to halt looting, curb pseudoarchaeology, and to help preserve archaeological sites through education and fostering public appreciation for the importance of archaeological heritage, archaeologists are mounting public-outreach campaigns. They seek to stop looting by combatting people who illegally take artifacts from protected sites, and by alerting people who live near archaeological sites of the threat of looting. Common methods of public outreach include press releases, the encouragement of school field trips to sites under excavation by professional archaeologists, and making reports and publications accessible outside of academia. Public appreciation of the significance of archaeology and archaeological sites often leads to improved protection from encroaching development or other threats.

One audience for archaeologists' work is the public. Archaeologists increasingly realize that their work can benefit non-academic and non-archaeological audiences, and that they have a responsibility to educate and inform the public about archaeology. Local heritage awareness is aimed at increasing civic and individual pride through projects such as community excavation projects, and better public presentations of archaeological sites and knowledge. The U.S. Dept. of Agriculture, Forest Service (USFS) operates a volunteer archaeology and historic preservation program called the Passport in Time (PIT). Volunteers work with professional USFS archaeologists and historians on national forests throughout the U.S. Volunteers are involved in all aspects of professional archaeology under expert supervision.

Television programs, web videos and social media can also bring an understanding of underwater archaeology to a broad audience. The Mardi Gras Shipwreck Project integrated a one-hour HD documentary, short videos for public viewing and video updates during the expedition as part of the educational outreach. Webcasting is also another tool for educational outreach. For one week in 2000 and 2001, live underwater video of the Queen Anne's Revenge Shipwreck Project was webcast to the Internet as a part of the QAR DiveLive educational program that reached thousands of children around the world. Created and co-produced by Nautilus Productions and Marine Grafics, this project enabled students to talk to scientists and learn about methods and technologies used by the underwater archaeology team.

In the UK, popular archaeology programs such as Time Team and Meet the Ancestors have resulted in a huge upsurge in public interest. Where possible, archaeologists now make more provisions for public involvement and outreach in larger projects than they once did, and many local archaeological organizations operate within the Community archaeology framework to expand public involvement in smaller-scale, more local projects. Archaeological excavation, however, is best undertaken by well-trained staff that can work quickly and accurately. Often this requires observing the necessary health and safety and indemnity insurance issues involved in working on a modern building site with tight deadlines. Certain charities and local government bodies sometimes offer places on research projects either as part of academic work or as a defined community project. There is also a flourishing industry selling places on commercial training excavations and archaeological holiday tours.

Archaeologists prize local knowledge and often liaise with local historical and archaeological societies, which is one reason why Community archaeology projects are starting to become more common. Often archaeologists are assisted by the public in the locating of archaeological sites, which professional archaeologists have neither the funding, nor the time to do.

Archaeological Legacy Institute (ALI), is a registered 501[c] [3] non-profit, media and education corporation registered in Oregon in 1999. ALI founded a website, The Archaeology Channel to support the organization's mission "to nurturing and bringing attention to the human cultural heritage, by using media in the most efficient and effective ways possible."

There is a considerable international body of research focused on archaeology and public value and tangible benefits of archaeology include helping to counteract racism, documenting accomplishments of ignored communities, providing time-depth as a response to short-termism of the modern age, contribution to human ecology, independent evidence base, historic context development and tourism  The delivery of public benefits through archaeology can be summarised as follows: through making a contribution to a shared history, artistic and cultural treasures, local values, place-making and social cohesion, educational benefits, contribution to science and innovation, health and wellbeing, and added economic value to developers.

Pseudoarchaeology

Pseudoarchaeology is an umbrella term for all activities that falsely claim to be archaeological but in fact violate commonly accepted and scientific archaeological practices. It includes much fictional archaeological work (discussed above), as well as some actual activity. Many non-fiction authors have ignored the scientific methods of processual archaeology, or the specific critiques of it contained in post-processualism.

An example of this type is the writing of Erich von Däniken. His 1968 book, Chariots of the Gods?, together with many subsequent lesser-known works, expounds a theory of ancient contacts between human civilization on Earth and more technologically advanced extraterrestrial civilizations. This theory, known as palaeocontact theory, or Ancient astronaut theory, is not exclusively Däniken's, nor did the idea originate with him. Works of this nature are usually marked by the renunciation of well-established theories on the basis of limited evidence, and the interpretation of evidence with a preconceived theory in mind.

Looting

Looting of archaeological sites is an ancient problem. For instance, many of the tombs of the Egyptian pharaohs were looted during antiquity. Archaeology stimulates interest in ancient objects, and people in search of artifacts or treasure cause damage to archaeological sites. The commercial and academic demand for artifacts unfortunately contributes directly to the illicit antiquities trade. Smuggling of antiquities abroad to private collectors has caused great cultural and economic damage in many countries whose governments lack the resources and or the will to deter it. Looters damage and destroy archaeological sites, denying future generations information about their ethnic and cultural heritage. Indigenous peoples especially lose access to and control over their 'cultural resources', ultimately denying them the opportunity to know their past.

In 1937, W. F. Hodge the Director of the Southwest Museum released a statement that the museum would no longer purchase or accept collections from looted contexts. The first conviction of the transport of artifacts illegally removed from private property under the Archaeological Resources Protection Act was in 1992 in the State of Indiana.

Archaeologists trying to protect artifacts may be placed in danger by looters or locals trying to protect the artifacts from archaeologists who are viewed as looters by the locals.

Some historical archaeology sites are subjected to looting by metal detector hobbyists who search for artifacts using increasingly advanced technology. Efforts are underway among all major Archaeological organizations to increase education and legitimate cooperation between amateurs and professionals in the metal detecting community.

While most looting is deliberate, accidental looting can occur when amateurs, who are unaware of the importance of Archaeological rigor, collect artifacts from sites and place them into private collections.

Descendant peoples
In the United States, examples such as the case of Kennewick Man have illustrated the tensions between Native Americans and archaeologists, which can be summarized as a conflict between a need to remain respectful toward sacred burial sites and the academic benefit from studying them. For years, American archaeologists dug on Indian burial grounds and other places considered sacred, removing artifacts and human remains to storage facilities for further study. In some cases human remains were not even thoroughly studied but instead archived rather than reburied. Furthermore, Western archaeologists' views of the past often differ from those of tribal peoples. The West views time as linear; for many natives, it is cyclic. From a Western perspective, the past is long-gone; from a native perspective, disturbing the past can have dire consequences in the present.

As a consequence of this, American Indians attempted to prevent archaeological excavation of sites inhabited by their ancestors, while American archaeologists believed that the advancement of scientific knowledge was a valid reason to continue their studies. This contradictory situation was addressed by the Native American Graves Protection and Repatriation Act (NAGPRA, 1990), which sought to reach a compromise by limiting the right of research institutions to possess human remains. Due in part to the spirit of postprocessualism, some archaeologists have begun to actively enlist the assistance of indigenous peoples likely to be descended from those under study.

Archaeologists have also been obliged to re-examine what constitutes an archaeological site in view of what native peoples believe to constitute sacred space. To many native peoples, natural features such as lakes, mountains or even individual trees have cultural significance. Australian archaeologists especially have explored this issue and attempted to survey these sites to give them some protection from being developed. Such work requires close links and trust between archaeologists and the people they are trying to help and at the same time study.

While this cooperation presents a new set of challenges and hurdles to fieldwork, it has benefits for all parties involved. Tribal elders cooperating with archaeologists can prevent the excavation of areas of sites that they consider sacred, while the archaeologists gain the elders' aid in interpreting their finds. There have also been active efforts to recruit aboriginal peoples directly into the archaeological profession.

Repatriation
See Repatriation and reburial of human remains
A new trend in the heated controversy between First Nations groups and scientists is the repatriation of native artifacts to the original descendants. An example of this occurred on 21 June 2005, when community members and elders from a number of the 10 Algonquian nations in the Ottawa area convened on the Kitigan Zibi reservation near Maniwaki, Quebec, to inter ancestral human remains and burial goods—some dating back 6,000 years. It was not determined, however, if the remains were directly related to the Algonquin people who now inhabit the region. The remains may be of Iroquoian ancestry, since Iroquoian people inhabited the area before the Algonquin. Moreover, the oldest of these remains might have no relation at all to the Algonquin or Iroquois, and belong to an earlier culture who previously inhabited the area.

The remains and artifacts, including jewelry, tools and weapons, were originally excavated from various sites in the Ottawa Valley, including Morrison and the Allumette Islands. They had been part of the Canadian Museum of Civilization's research collection for decades, some since the late 19th century. Elders from various Algonquin communities conferred on an appropriate reburial, eventually deciding on traditional red cedar and birch bark boxes lined with red cedar chips, muskrat and beaver pelts.

An inconspicuous rock mound marks the reburial site where close to 80 boxes of various sizes are buried. Because of this reburial, no further scientific study is possible. Although negotiations were at times tense between the Kitigan Zibi community and museum, they were able to reach agreement.

African diaspora archaeology 
Similar to the experience of Native Americans, the history of African diaspora archaeology is one of controversies over Whiteness in archaeology and anthropology, a lack of inclusion of the African descendant community, and possession of human remains in the collections of universities and museums. In the 1990s, anthropologist Michael Blakey was the director of research during the New York African Burial Ground Project where he initiated a protocol for collaborating with the African descendant community. In 2011, the Society of Black Archaeologists was created in the United States. Co-founders Ayana Omilade Flewellen, archaeologist at the University of California, Riverside and Justin Dunnavant, archaeologist and assistant professor of anthropology at the University of California, Los Angeles intend to build a restorative justice-based structure in archaeology. They suggest to define descendants not only in genealogical terms, but also to welcome input of African Americans whose ancestors had a shared historical experience in enslavement.

The United States Senate unanimously passed a bill in December 2020 that centres African American cemeteries at risk in South Carolina. The bill is made to better protect historic African burial grounds and can lead to the creation of an African American Burial Grounds Network. Barbados, eight days after becoming a republic on November 30, 2021, announced plans for the construction of the Newton Enslaved Burial Ground Memorial as well as a museum dedicated to the history of the Atlantic slave trade. The Ghanaian-British architect David Adjaye is to lead the project that is to commemorate an estimated 570 West Africans buried in unmarked graves at the site of the former Newton sugar plantation. Barbados can be seen as a good example of respectful preservation of an African burial ground. Throughout the Americas however the burial grounds are in danger of being destroyed or human remains are being excavated without the descendant community being involved. In 2022, residents on Sint Eustatius, Dutch Caribbean spoke out strongly against what they found were unethical excavations of their ancestors on the Godet African Burial Ground and the Golden Rock African Burial Ground.

Climate change and archaeology
As anthropogenic climate change affects our environment, projections show that there will be changes in rainfall with increased drought and desertification, increases in intensity and frequency of rainfall, increases in temperature (winter and summer), increases in both the temperature and frequency of heatwaves, rising sea levels, and warmer seas, ocean acidification and changes in oceanic currents. These climate drivers will result in changes to flora and fauna, and changes in ground conditions (both on and below the surface) and so will also affect archaeological deposits and structures, while human responses to the climate crisis will also impact archaeological sites. The archaeologist's knowledge and skills are relevant to supporting society in adapting to a changing climate and a low carbon future. Archaeological sites can be seen as habitats that supporting ecosystems and fulfil biodiversity goals.

See also

 
 
 
 
 
 
 Conservation and restoration of archaeological sites
 
 
 
 
 
 
 
 
 

Lists
 List of archaeological excavations by date
 List of archaeological periods
 List of archaeological sites by country
 List of archaeologists
 List of archaeology awards
 List of paleoethnobotanists

Notes

References

Bibliography

Further reading

 Archaeology (magazine)
 Lewis Binford - New Perspectives in Archaeology (1968) 
 Glyn Daniel – A Short History of Archaeology (1991)
 Kevin Greene – Introduction to Archaeology (1983)
 Thomas Hester, Harry Shafer, and Kenneth L. Feder – Field Methods in Archaeology 7th edition (1997)
 Ian Hodder & Scott Hutson – "Reading the Past" 3rd. edition (2003)
 
 International Journal of South American Archaeology - IJSA (magazine)
 Internet Archaeology, e-journal
 C.U. Larsen - Sites and Monuments (1992)
 Adrian Praetzellis – Death by Theory, AltaMira Press (2000).  
 Colin Renfrew & Paul Bahn – Archaeology: theories, methods and practice, 2nd edition (1996)
 Smekalova, T.N.; Voss O.; & Smekalov S.L. (2008). "Magnetic Surveying in Archaeology. More than 10 years of using the Overhauser GSM-19 gradiometer". Wormianum.
 David Hurst Thomas – Archaeology, 3rd. edition (1998)
 Robert J. Sharer & Wendy Ashmore – Archaeology: Discovering our Past 2nd edition (1993)
 Bruce Trigger – "A History of Archaeological Thought" 2nd. edition (2007)
 Alison Wylie – Thinking From Things: Essays in the Philosophy of Archaeology, University of California Press, Berkeley CA, 2002

External links

 

 Fasti Online – an online database of archaeological sites
 The Archaeology Data Service – Open access online archive for UK and global archaeology
 World Archaeology News – weekly update from BBC Radio archaeologist, Win Scutt
 The Archaeology Channel

 
Anthropology